Siamak Yassemi (Persian: سیامک یاسمی) is an Iranian mathematician and is currently the Dean of Faculty of Mathematics, Statistics and Computer Science, University of Tehran, Iran. He has found basic techniques that have played important roles in the field homological algebra. His recent works have established relationships between monomial ideals in commutative algebra and graphs in combinatorics, which have stimulated the development of the new interdisciplinary field combinatorial commutative algebra. Member of the Academy of Sciences of the Islamic Republic of Iran, he has received the COMSTECH International Award, the 22nd Khwarizmi International Award in Basic Science and the International Award from Tehran University, among others. He was the vice president of the University College of Sciences at the University of Tehran for more than three years, ending in 2007. He was the head of the School of Mathematics at the Institute for Research in Fundamental Sciences for more than two years. In 2015 he started to act as the head of the school of Mathematics, statistics and computer sciences at the University of Tehran. In 2018 he was elected by The World Academy of Sciences as a fellow member. That would make him the first Iranian mathematician who's ever been a member of TWAS. In 2019 he was named Chevalier of the Ordre des Palmes Académiques for distinguished effort on extended multi-dimensional cooperation, including scientific research projects (Jundi-Shapur), student-and professor- exchanges, and several schools and conferences.

Life 
Yassemi was born in Khorramshar, Iran.

Education 
Yassemi completed his PhD under the supervision of Hans-Bjørn Foxby at the University of Copenhagen in 1994. He has since devoted a substantial part of his career to mathematical education.

Honours 
In 2009 he received the Khwarizmi International Award in basic sciences and in the same year he received the COMSTECH international award. The title of the project that has won the prize was "Homological and Combinatorial Methods in Commutative Algebra". He was an associate member of the Abdus Salam International Centre for Theoretical Physics (Trieste-Italy) for eight years (1996–2004). He's visited the Max Planck Institut für Mathematik in Bonn, the Institut des Hautes Études Scientifiques in Paris, and the Tata Institute of Fundamental Research in Mumbai several times.

In 2018 he was elected by The World Academy of Sciences as a fellow member. That would make him the first Iranian mathematician who's ever been a member of TWAS.

In 2019 he was named Chevalier of the Ordre des Palmes Académiques for distinguished effort on extended multi-dimensional cooperation.

References

External links 
 Siamak Yassemi

Living people
21st-century Iranian mathematicians
Year of birth missing (living people)
Academic staff of the University of Tehran